The Faha Massacre Site is located just behind the Pigua cemetery in the village of Merizo on the United States island of Guam.  The site is demarcated by four concrete pillars, connected by metal cables, with several crosses placed inside that area.  A metal plaque mounted on a concrete block commemorates the thirty native Chamorro men who were slaughtered here on July 16, 1944, by members of the Imperial Japanese Army (IJA) during the Japanese occupation of the island during World War II.  The IJA routinely forced Guam's native population to work on its construction projects.  The men who were killed here were rounded up for a work crew; why they were killed is unclear, as there were no survivors.  The massacre took place one day after the Tinta Massacre (in which 46 were killed), and about one week before the liberation of the island began.

The site was listed on the National Register of Historic Places in 1991.

See also
National Register of Historic Places listings in Guam

References

World War II on the National Register of Historic Places in Guam
Buildings and structures completed in 1944
Japanese war crimes